"Talk You Down" is a song by Irish rock band the Script, released as the fourth single from their self-titled debut album The Script. The track was released on 16 March 2009. "Talk You Down" peaked at #47 on the UK Singles Chart, in March 2009.

Track listing
 CD single
 "Talk You Down" – 3:50
 "None The Wiser" (Demo Version) – 3:18
 "Before The Worst" (Armand Van Helden Remix) – 3:23
 "Talk You Down" (Music Video) – 3:50

 Digital download
 "Talk You Down" – 3:50
 "Talk You Down" (Music Video) – 3:50

 "UK Promo"
 "Talk You Down" – 3:50

Charts

References

2008 songs
2009 singles
The Script songs
Songs written by Danny O'Donoghue
Songs written by Mark Sheehan
Songs written by Glen Power
Sony Music singles